Nicolas van Sprang (born 14 June 1993) is a Dutch rower. He competed in the men's coxless pair at the 2020 Summer Olympics. Rowing with Guillaume Krommenhoek, the pair finishing 7th overall, winning the B final.

References

External links

Niki Van Sprang at California Golden Bears

1993 births
Living people
Dutch male rowers
Rowers at the 2020 Summer Olympics
Olympic rowers of the Netherlands
Rowers from Berlin
Rowers from Amsterdam
California Golden Bears rowers
World Rowing Championships medalists for the Netherlands
21st-century Dutch people